Sipple House is a historic home located at Leipsic, Kent County, Delaware.  It was built about 1885, and is a two-story, cruciform plan frame single pile dwelling with a later rear ell.  It has a gable roof with box cornice and Italianate style brackets and a projecting center bay topped by a mansard roof.  It features a distyle front porch and tetrastyle east gable-end porch.

It was listed on the National Register of Historic Places in 1982.

References

Houses on the National Register of Historic Places in Delaware
Italianate architecture in Delaware
Houses completed in 1885
Houses in Kent County, Delaware
National Register of Historic Places in Kent County, Delaware
Leipsic, Delaware